Jose Lladó Fernandez-Urrutia (Madrid, 1934), is a politician and Spanish businessman.

Son of the President of the Bank Urquijo - Juan Lladó Sanchez - and grandson of the republican deputy Jose Lladó Vallés, he took a doctor's degree in Chemical Sciences at the University of Madrid. He is a Member of Honor of the American Chemical Society. He was executive President of the CSIC. In addition, he was appointed in 1976 Minister of Trade and then, in 1977 Minister of Transport and Communications. Later, in 1979 he was Ambassador of Spain in the United States. He was the first President of the Royal Patronage of the Museo Nacional Centro de Arte Reina Sofía.

He is the President of  the INCIPE Foundation, President of the Jury of the Arts Award of the Prince of Asturias Awards since 1991 and President of the Xavier Zubiri Foundation.

He has been a member of the Board of the Trustees of important Spanish companies, and he is President - Founder and principal shareholder of Tecnicas Reunidas.

Personal life 
He has five children from Pilar Arburua, Pilar, Juan (married to Susana Álvarez Salas), María, José Manuel (married to Marta Tiagonce) and Marta (married to Carlos Romero, son of the Count de Fontao).

References 

Government ministers of Spain
Union of the Democratic Centre (Spain) politicians
1934 births
Politicians from Madrid
Ambassadors of Spain to the United States
Living people
Businesspeople from Madrid
Spanish billionaires
20th-century Spanish businesspeople
21st-century Spanish businesspeople